Sir Armigel de Vins Wade CMG OBE (17 October 1880 – 4 December 1966) was a British colonial official.

Life
Wade was born at Henfield, Sussex on 17 October 1880 the son of Charles Wade, a solicitor, and his wife Sarah. 
Wade was educated at Lancing College before studying at Keble College, Oxford.  After graduation, he taught classics at Worksop College, Nottinghamshire and at the Forest School, before being appointed Assistant District Commissioner in the East Africa Protectorate in 1912. He was made an Officer of the Order of the British Empire (OBE) in 1931.  In the following year, he became Chief Native Commissioner in Kenya Colony.  He was Chief Secretary to the Government of Kenya between 1934 and 1939; he was made a Companion of the Order of St Michael and St George (CMG) in 1935 and knighted in 1937.  He had two spells as Acting Governor and Commander-in-Chief of Kenya, between March and August 1935, and between December 1936 and April 1937. He retired in 1939.  He returned to Britain and spent some of his later years in Pulborough, Sussex, and died on 4 December 1966.

References

1880 births
1966 deaths
People educated at Lancing College
Alumni of Keble College, Oxford
British colonial governors and administrators in Africa
Companions of the Order of St Michael and St George
Officers of the Order of the British Empire
Knights Bachelor
East Africa Protectorate people
British Kenya people
Colonial governors and administrators of Kenya
Chief Secretaries of Kenya
People from Henfield